Haubstadt State Bank, also known as Old Haubstadt State Bank and New Town Hall, is a historic bank building located at Haubstadt, Gibson County, Indiana.  It was built in 1904, and is a -story, brick and Indiana limestone building with two additions.  It features Chicago style commercial window openings. The building was remodeled in 1954. The bank became the town hall in 1980.

It was listed on the National Register of Historic Places in 1984.

References

Bank buildings on the National Register of Historic Places in Indiana
Commercial buildings completed in 1904
Buildings and structures in Gibson County, Indiana
National Register of Historic Places in Gibson County, Indiana